Opodiphthera is a genus of moths from the family Saturniidae that are endemic to Australia.

Opodiphthera makes up the majority of Australia's saturniid moths. The genus contains the emperor gum moth (O. eucalypti), one of Australia's most renowned moths.

Species
Opodiphthera astrophela Walker, 1855
Opodiphthera carnea (Sonthonnax, 1899)
Opodiphthera engaea Turner, 1922
Opodiphthera eucalypti Scott, 1864
Opodiphthera excavus Lane, 1995
Opodiphthera fervida Jordan, 1910
Opodiphthera helena (White, 1843)
Opodiphthera jurriaansei Van Eecke, 1933
Opodiphthera loranthi Lucas, 1891
Opodiphthera rhythmica (Turner, 1936)
Opodiphthera saccopoea (Turner, 1924)
Opodiphthera sulphurea Lane & Naumann, 2003

References
 CSIRO Ecosystem Sciences
 Encyclopedia of Life

 
Saturniidae